MPR500 is a  Multi-Purpose Rigid penetration and surface attack bomb manufactured by Israel Military Industries. It has the effectiveness and dimensions of a Mark 84 bomb and can penetrate 1 meter reinforced concrete. Was approved by Boeing for the JDAM guidance kit. During Operation Protective Edge, the Israeli Air Force realized that the MPR provides 95% hitting and target destruction effectiveness.

References

Aerial bombs of Israel